Amboy is a city in Lee County, Illinois, United States, along the Green River. The population was 2,500 at the 2010 census. The chain of Carson Pirie Scott & Co. began in Amboy when Samuel Carson opened his first dry goods store there in 1854. The Christian denomination Community of Christ, formerly the Reorganized Church of Jesus Christ of Latter Day Saints, had a general conference in Amboy on April 6, 1860, at which time Joseph Smith III reorganized the church founded by his father Joseph Smith, Jr.

History
Amboy had its start in the 1850s when the Illinois Central Railroad was extended to that point. The community's name is a transfer from Amboy, New Jersey.

The Illinois Central facility in Amboy served as the railroad's division headquarters for the railroad's region. The building was saved from demolition and is a museum. The actual railroad and trainyard were abandoned and removed in the early 90's.

Amboy was the site of an ammunition factory for World War II - The Green River Ordinance Plant. It was roughly bordered by Sterling Rd to the south, Bataan Rd to the East, and Bataan Rd. to the North and West of the facility. The facility employed 4500 people at one time. The facility was completed on Dec. 15, 1942 and used until VJ day in August 1945.

Geography
Amboy is located at  (41.714411, -89.332671).

Demographics

At the 2000 census there were 2,561 people, known as Amboian, 963 households, and 651 families in the city. The racial makeup of the city was 97.97% White, 0.78% African American, 0.04% Native American, 0.23% from other races, and 0.98% from two or more races. Hispanic or Latino of any race were 2.15%.

Of the 963 households 34.9% had children under the age of 18 living with them, 51.9% were married couples living together, 10.9% had a female householder with no husband present, and 32.3% were non-families. 28.8% of households were one person and 15.3% were one person aged 65 or older. The average household size was 2.55 and the average family size was 3.12.

The age distribution was 27.6% under the age of 18, 8.3% from 18 to 24, 27.7% from 25 to 44, 18.7% from 45 to 64, and 17.7% 65 or older. The median age was 36 years. For every 100 females, there were 96.2 males. For every 100 females age 18 and over, there were 91.8 males.

The median household income was $36,250 and the median family income  was $42,027. Males had a median income of $35,250 versus $26,105 for females. The per capita income for the city was $18,183. About 4.4% of families and 8.3% of the population were below the poverty line, including 8.4% of those under age 18 and 9.3% of those age 65 or over.

Notable people

 Betty Degner, All-American Girls Professional Baseball League player
 Augustus Newnham Dickens, brother of Charles Dickens
 Henry F. McElroy, Missouri businessman and politician
 Michael M. Mihm (born 1943), Senior United States District Judge of the United States District Court for the Central District of Illinois.
 David C. Shapiro, dentist and Illinois state legislator
 Frank Shaughnessy, Notre Dame football player, pro baseball player and executive

See also
 Amboy Illinois Central Depot

External Links

 Official web site

References

Cities in Illinois
Cities in Lee County, Illinois
Populated places established in 1854
1854 establishments in Illinois